The Clayton School is a historic structure located in Clayton, Iowa, United States.  The two-story structure, composed of native limestone, reflects the prosperity of the mid-19th century when it was built.  It served as a school building into the late 20th century when the district consolidated with a neighboring school district because of declining enrollment. The building went on to serve as a city hall and community center.  Completed in 1860, the rectangular building features bracketed eaves, and a gabled roof that is capped with dormers and an octagon-shaped cupola. It was listed on the National Register of Historic Places in 1974.

References

School buildings completed in 1860
Defunct schools in Iowa
Vernacular architecture in Iowa
Buildings and structures in Clayton County, Iowa
National Register of Historic Places in Clayton County, Iowa
School buildings on the National Register of Historic Places in Iowa